Joyce Demmin is a Trinidad and Tobago women's cricketer who played for the Trinidad and Tobago women's cricket team in the 1970s.

References

External links
 cricketarchive
 Cricinfo

Year of birth missing (living people)
Living people
Trinidad and Tobago women cricketers
West Indian women cricketers